The Chinese reusable experimental spacecraft (CSSHQ) is the first Chinese reusable spacecraft. It was first launched on 4 September 2020 at 07:30 UTC on a Long March 2F from the Jiuquan Satellite Launch Center, in the Gobi Desert of northwestern China. Xinhua News Agency said in a report, "After a period of in-orbit operation, the spacecraft will return to the scheduled landing site in China. It will test reusable technologies during its flight, providing technological support for the peaceful use of space".

Unofficial reports indicate that the spacecraft is part of the Shenlong spaceplane, which is claimed to be similar to the Boeing X-37B.

History
On 6 September 2020, two days after the launch, the CSSHQ successfully returned to an airbase. Marco Langbroek and Jonathan McDowell said the landing site was an airbase at Lop Nur.

On 7 September 2020, commercial satellite reconnaissance company Planet Labs published a satellite photo of a  runway at Lop Nur, taken shortly after the landing of the spaceplane. Astronomer Jonathan McDowell of the Harvard-Smithsonian Center for Astrophysics, speculated that one of the dots visible on the runway is the Chinese spaceplane.

2nd mission 
On 4 August 2022 at around 16:00 UTC, the CSSHQ was launched for a second time, also on top of a Long March 2F. It raised its orbit on August 25 to a near-circular 597 by 608-kilometer orbit.

Specifications

Chen Hongbo, of China Aerospace Science and Technology Corporation (CASC), the main contractor for China's space agency, said during a 2017 interview that China's space plane would be able to be re-used up to 20 times.  Chen said the vehicle's first stage would use a scramjet engine.

On 24 March 2020, officials said the vehicle was designed to carry a crew of six.

Speculation over the spaceplane's role

When asked to speculate on the spaceplane's role Brian Weeden, director of program planning for the Secure World Foundation said, "It's a great question. We're not even really sure why the U.S. military is pursuing a space plane."

Jonathan McDowell speculated that the very high speeds the spaceplane underwent during re-entry might help the Chinese in their development of hypersonic missiles. He added the Chinese may have thought, "If the Americans have one of those, there's got to be a good reason for it, so we better get one too."

References 

Reusable spaceflight technology
Space program of the People's Republic of China
Spacecraft launched in 2020
Individual space vehicles
Secret space vehicles